Prepelaus (4th century BC) was a general in the service of Cassander, king of Macedonia. In 317 BC, Cassander sent Prepelaus and Eupolemus as joint commanders of an army to support Asander in Caria, in cooperation against Ptolemy, the nephew of Antigonus. In 315 BC, during the campaign, he was sent by Cassander on an ultimately successful mission to persuade Alexander, the son of Polyperchon, to desert Antigonus and join the Macedonians. Prepelaus is mentioned in 303 BC, when he held the important fortress of Corinth with a large force, but was unable to prevent its fall at the hands of Demetrius, and narrowly escaped capture. In the following summer (302 BC) he was successful in joint ventures with Lysimachus in Asia Minor, where he reduced the key cities of Adramyttium, Ephesus, and Sardis, and conquered the majority of Aeolia and Ionia. Ultimately, Demetrius was able to recover most of the lands captured by Prepelaus before the close of the same autumn. In 301 BC, Prepelaus fought in the decisive Battle of Ipsus, the battle where Antigonus was defeated and died.

References
Smith, William (editor); Dictionary of Greek and Roman Biography and Mythology, "Prepelaus", Boston, (1867)

Notes

Antipatrid generals
4th-century BC Macedonians